The FIBT World Championships 2007 took place in St. Moritz, Switzerland for the record twenty-first time, doing so previously in 1931 (Four-man), 1935 (Four-man), 1937 (Four-man), 1938 (Two-man), 1939 (Two-man), 1947, 1955, 1957, 1959, 1965, 1970, 1974, 1977, 1982, 1987, 1989 (Skeleton), 1990 (Bobsleigh), 1997 (Bobsleigh), 1998 (Skeleton), and 2001 (Men's bobsleigh). The mixed team event consisting of one run each of men's skeleton, women's skeleton, 2-man bobsleigh, and 2-women bobsleigh debuted at these championships.

Bobsleigh

Two man

Four man

Two woman

Skeleton

Men

Women

Pikus-Pace is the first American woman to win a gold medal in bobsleigh, luge, and skeleton at the World Championship level.

Mixed team

Medal table

References
World Championships • St. Moritz • 2-man Bobsleigh
World Championships • St. Moritz • 2-woman Bobsleigh
World Championships • St. Moritz • 4-man Bobsleigh
2-Man bobsleigh World Champions
2-Woman bobsleigh World Champions
4-Man bobsleigh World Champions
Men's skeleton World Champions
Mixed bobsleigh/skeleton World Champions
Women's skeleton World Champions

External links
Official website 

2007 in bobsleigh
IBSF World Championships
2007 in skeleton
Sport in St. Moritz
International sports competitions hosted by Switzerland
2011 in bobsleigh
2011 in skeleton
2011 in Swiss sport
Bobsleigh in Switzerland